Two railway stations in Falmouth, Cornwall have been known as Falmouth railway station:
 From 1863 to 1970, it was the station now known as Falmouth Docks railway station.
 From 1970 to 1975, it was the station now known as Falmouth Town railway station.
Penmere railway station is also in Falmouth.

In the United States, there is also a railway station called Falmouth, which is currently abandoned.